Heinz Lange (2 October 1917 – 26 February 2006) was an officer and pilot in the Luftwaffe of Nazi Germany during World War II who briefly commanded fighter wing Jagdgeschwader 51. He was a recipient of the Knight's Cross of the Iron Cross.

Career
Lange was born on 2 October 1917 in Cologne, at the time in the Rhine Province, the westernmost province of the Kingdom of Prussia within the German Empire. On 15 July 1939, Lange was posted to the newly created I. Gruppe (1st group) of Jagdgeschwader 21 (JG 21—21st Fighter Wing). The Gruppe was formed at Jesau near Königsberg, present-day Kaliningrad in Russia, and placed under the command of Hauptmann Martin Mettig. Equipped with the Messerschmitt Bf 109 D-1, the Gruppe was ordered to Gutenfeld, present-day Lugovoye, in July 1939.

World War II
World War II in Europe began on Friday 1 September 1939 when German forces invaded Poland. That day, I. Gruppe of JG 21 moved to Arys-Rostken, present-day Orzysz-Rostki. On 16 September, Lange crashed his Bf 109 D-1 at Klein Zechen, present-day Szczechy Małe, due to setting darkness.

On 18 October 1939, Lange had a takeoff accident in his Bf 109 D-1 at Celle Airfield. The Blenheim was on a reconnaissance mission to the area of Osnabrück.

On 4 May 1941, III. Gruppe of Jagdgeschwader 54 (JG 54—54th Fighter Wing) was began relocating from Belgrad-Semlin by train to Germany, arriving at Airfield Stolp-Reitz in Pomerania, present-day Słupsk, on 10 May.

Operation Barbarossa
At Stolp-Reitz, JG 54 upgraded their aircraft to the Bf 109 F-2. For the next four weeks, the pilots familiarized themselves with the new aircraft before on 15 June, III. Gruppe was ordered to Blumenfeld in East Prussia, present-day Karczarningken in the Kaliningrad Oblast, in preparation for Operation Barbarossa, the invasion of the Soviet Union. During the upcoming invasion, JG 54 would be deployed in the area of Army Group North, was subordinated to I. Fliegerkorps (1st Air Corps) and supported the 16th and 18th Army as well as the Panzer Group 4 in their strategic objective to reach Leningrad. On 30 June, Lange claimed his first aerial victories on the Eastern Front when he show down two Ilyushin DB-3 bombers shout down over southern Latvia.

On 1 October, Lange was transferred and appointed Staffelkapitän (squadron leader) of 1. Staffel (1st squadron) of JG 54. He succeeded Hauptmann Reinhard Seiler was given command of III. Gruppe (3rd group) of JG 54.

On 15 October 1942, Lange left 1. Staffel of JG 54 and transferred command to Leutnant Walter Nowotny. On 6 November, Lange was then given command of 3. Staffel of Jagdgeschwader 51 (JG 51—51st Fighter Wing). He took over command from Oberleutnant Michael Sonner who had been transferred a week earlier. From 15 to 30 August 1943, Lange was temporarily placed in command of I. Gruppe of JG 51, stepping in for Major Erich Leie. During this assignment, command of 3. Staffel briefly passed on to Leutnant Walther Wever.

Group commander
On 9 May 1944, Lange succeeded Major Hans-Ekkehard Bob as Gruppenkommandeur (group commander) of IV. Gruppe of JG 51. Command of his former 3. Staffel was then officially passed on to Wever. At the time, IV. Gruppe of JG 51 was based at Lysiatychi. On 22 June, Soviet forces launched Operation Bagration, the strategic offensive operation against Army Group Centre. In consequence, IV. On 28 August, IV. Here, the Gruppe predominately flew combat missions to the area north and northeast of Warsaw. Lange was awarded the Knight's Cross of the Iron Cross on 18 November for 70 aerial victories. He received the award together with fellow IV. Gruppepilot Oberfeldwebel Heinz Marquardt who had been credited with 89 aerial victories at the time.

Wing commander and end of war
On 2 April 1945, he was appointed Geschwaderkommodore (wing commander) of fighter wing JG 51. He succeeded Major Fritz Losigkeit who took command of Jagdgeschwader 77 (JG 77—77th Fighter Wing). Command of IV. Gruppe of JG 51 was then passed to Oberleutnant Günther Josten.

Shortly after the end of the war the British wanted to evaluate the performance of the German Focke Wulf Fw 190 D-13/R11 "Yellow 10" (Werknummer 836017—factory number) which had been assigned to the Geschwaderkommodore of Jagdgeschwader 26, Major Franz Götz. At Flensburg, the British Disarmament Wing wanted to compare the fighter's performance against a Hawker Tempest. Squadron Leader Evans approached Lange and asked him to fly a mock combat against one of their pilots. Lange accepted, even though he had only ten flights in a D-9. The machines proved evenly matched. Lange assessed that the outcome of such a contest greatly depended on the skills of the individual pilot. At the time Lange was not aware that he was not flying a D-13, but rather a D-9. "Yellow 10" was further subjected to mock combat when on 25 June 1945 Josten was asked to fly a comparison flight against another Tempest. This very rare Fw 190 D-13/R11 is now on display at the Flying Heritage & Combat Armor Museum in Everett, Washington, which recently had its Junkers Jumo 213 engine made operable once more. However, it will not be flown again.

After the war Lange attended the University of Kiel and studied law receiving a doctorate in jurisprudence (Dr. jur.) degree. In August 1950 he started his career working for the Gerling Insurance Group. He retired in 1982.

Summary of career

Aerial victory claims
According to US historian David T. Zabecki, Lange was credited with 70 aerial victories. Obermaier aloso lists him with 70 aerial victories, claimed in 628 combat missions, all but one on the Eastern Front. Mathews and Foreman, authors of Luftwaffe Aces — Biographies and Victory Claims, researched the German Federal Archives and found records for 73 aerial victory claims, plus one further unconfirmed claim. This figure includes 72 aerial victories on the Eastern Front and one over the Western Allies.

Victory claims were logged to a map-reference (PQ = Planquadrat), for example "PQ 1928". These sectors were then subdivided into 36 smaller units to give a location area 3 × 4 km in size.

Awards
 Honour Goblet of the Luftwaffe (Ehrenpokal der Luftwaffe) on 20 September 1943 as Oberleutnant and Staffelkapitän
 German Cross in Gold on 17 May 1943 as Hauptmann in the 3./Jagdgeschwader 51
 Knight's Cross of the Iron Cross on 18 November 1944 as Hauptmann and Gruppenkommandeur of the IV./Jagdgeschwader 51 "Mölders"

Notes

References

Citations

Bibliography

 
 
 
 
 
 
 
 
 
 
 
 
 
 
 
 
 
 
 
 
 
 
 
 
 

1917 births
2006 deaths
Military personnel from Cologne
Luftwaffe pilots
German World War II flying aces
Recipients of the Gold German Cross
Recipients of the Knight's Cross of the Iron Cross
University of Kiel alumni
People from the Rhine Province